The Journal of Molecular Biology is a biweekly peer-reviewed scientific journal covering all aspects of molecular biology. It was established in 1959 and is published by Elsevier. The editor-in-chief is Peter Wright (The Scripps Research Institute).

Abstracting and indexing
The journal is abstracted and indexed in:

According to the Journal Citation Reports, the journal has a 2020 impact factor of 5.469.

Notable articles 
Some of the most highly cited articles that have appeared in the journal are:
, in which Jacques Monod, Jeffries Wyman, and Jean-Pierre Changeux presented the MWC model, that explained the cooperativity exhibited by allosteric proteins, such as hemoglobin.
, in which Edwin Southern presented the first description of nucleic acid blotting, a technique that revolutionized the field of molecular biology.
, in which the Smith–Waterman algorithm for determining the degree of homology of DNA, RNA, or protein sequences was first described.
, in which the nucleic acid and protein homology search algorithm known as BLAST was originally described.

References

External links 
 

Elsevier academic journals
Publications established in 1959
Biochemistry journals
Hybrid open access journals
Biweekly journals
English-language journals